The Neiva Campeiro is a Brazilian two-seat utility monoplane built by Indústria Aeronáutica Neiva for the Brazilian Air Force. The Campeiro was based on the earlier Neiva Paulistinha 56 with a re-designed structure and powered by a 150 hp (112 kW) Avco Lycoming O-320-A piston engine. The Camperiro was a braced high-wing monoplane with a fixed tailwheel landing gear. Twenty aircraft were built for the Brazilian Air Force as the L-7 Campeiro and were used for liaison, observation, rescue and training.

Operators

Brazilian Air Force

Specifications

See also

References

Notes

Bibliography
 

Campeiro
1960s Brazilian civil utility aircraft
Single-engined tractor aircraft
High-wing aircraft